The 1970 Primera División season was the 79th season of top-flight football in Argentina, with Independiente winning the Metropolitano championship (9th title) by goals for difference (43–42) after being equaled on points with River Plate. In the Nacional championship, Boca Juniors (coached by José María Silvero after Alfredo Di Stéfano resigned) won its 18th league title after beating Rosario Central in the final. 

Starting this season, two substitutions were allowed per team during the game. That rule had been first introduced in 1959, but for injured goalkeepers only.

Unlike previous seasons, there was no team promoted from Primera B Metropolitana. Boca Juniors and Rosario Central (as champion and runner up of Nacional respectively) qualified to 1971 Copa Libertadores. On the other hand, Lanús, Quilmes and Unión (SF) were relegated.

Campeonato Metropolitano

Standings

Petit Tournament

Reclasificatorio Tournament

Reclasificatorio de Primera Tournament
This tournament was contested by two teams from Primera B Metropolitana (Ferro Carril Oeste and Almirante Brown) and teams placed 4th and 5th in Reclasificatorio Tournament, in order to define the rest two promoted or relegated clubs. After finishing 1st, Ferro Carril Oeste promoted to Primera División.

Top scorers

Campeonato Nacional

Group A

Group B

Semifinals
Played under a single-match format in neutral venue:

Final

Match details

Top scorers

References

Argentine Primera División seasons
pr
pr
a
1